The Berrichon is an extinct breed of horse from central France. It was bred principally in the area around Berry, France. It was used in public transportation by the General Omnibus Company to pull buses in Paris between 1855 and 1900.  The remnants of the breed were merged into the Percheron in 1966.

References 

Horse breeds originating in France
Extinct horse breeds
Horse breeds